The Roman Catholic Diocese of Mahajanga is a diocese located in the city of Mahajanga in the Ecclesiastical province of Antsiranana in Madagascar.

History
 March 15, 1923: Established as Apostolic Vicariate of Majunga from the Apostolic Vicariate of Diégo-Suarez
 September 14, 1955: Promoted as Diocese of Majunga 
 October 28, 1989: Renamed as Diocese of Mahajanga

Bishops
Vicars Apostolic of Majunga 
 Paul-Auguste-Marie Pichot, C.S.Sp. (1923.03.16 – 1940.05.10)
 Jean Wolff, C.S.Sp. (1941.07.08 – 1947.02.13)
 Jean Batiot, C.S.Sp. (1947.02.13 – 1953.08.31)
 Jean David, C.S.Sp. (1954.02.22 – 1955.09.14)
 Bishops of Majunga 
 Jean David, C.S.Sp. (1955.09.14 – 1978.04.27)
 Armand Gaétan Razafindratandra (1978.04.27 – 1989.10.28)
 Bishops of Mahajanga 
 Armand Gaétan Razafindratandra (1989.10.28 – 1994.02.03)
 Michel Malo, Ist. del Prado (1996.03.29 – 1998.11.28)
 Joseph Ignace Randrianasolo (1999.06.03 – 2010.02.02)
 Roger Victor Rakotondrajao (2010.02.02 – 2018.11.03)
 Zygmunt Robaszkiewicz, M.S.F. (2022.11.19 – present)

Coadjutor Bishop
Roger Victor Rakotondrajao (2008-2010)

Auxiliary Bishops
Michel Malo, Ist. del Prado (1988-1993), appointed	Auxiliary Bishop of Antsiranana; later returned here as Bishop
Armand Toasy (1984-1987), appointed Bishop of Miarinarivo

See also
Roman Catholicism in Madagascar

Sources
 GCatholic.org
 Catholic Hierarchy

Roman Catholic dioceses in Madagascar
Christian organizations established in 1923
Roman Catholic dioceses and prelatures established in the 20th century
Roman Catholic Ecclesiastical Province of Antsiranana
1923 establishments in Madagascar